Conus grahami is a species of sea snail, a marine gastropod mollusk in the family Conidae, the cone snails and their allies.

Like all species within the genus Conus, these snails are predatory and venomous. They are capable of "stinging" humans, therefore live ones should be handled carefully or not at all.

The following two subspecies of Conus grahami are recognized by the World Register of Marine Species:
 Conus grahami grahami Röckel, Cosel & Burnay, 1980: accepted
 Conus grahami luziensis Rolán, Röckel & Monteiro, 1983: accepted

Description
The size of the shell varies between 18 mm and 30 mm.

Distribution
This species occurs in the Atlantic Ocean off the Cape Verde islands of São Vicente (Conus grahami grahami) and Santa Luzia (Conus grahami luziensis).

References

 Rolán E., 2005. Malacological Fauna From The Cape Verde Archipelago. Part 1, Polyplacophora and Gastropoda.
  Puillandre N., Duda T.F., Meyer C., Olivera B.M. & Bouchet P. (2015). One, four or 100 genera? A new classification of the cone snails. Journal of Molluscan Studies. 81: 1–23

External links
 The Conus Biodiversity website
 Cone Shells - Knights of the Sea

Gallery

grahami
Gastropods described in 1980
Gastropods of Cape Verde
Fauna of São Vicente, Cape Verde